Rhomphaea fictilium is a species of cobweb spider in the family Theridiidae. It is found in a range from Canada to Argentina.

References

Theridiidae
Articles created by Qbugbot
Spiders described in 1850